Greater Clark County Schools is a public school district serving sections of Clark County, Indiana. The district is the largest in the county, out of three, and one of the largest in southern Indiana. The district operates 20 schools located in Jeffersonville, Utica, Charlestown, New Washington, and Clarksville. The current superintendent is Mark Laughner.

Administration 

The corporation is led by a superintendent, who oversees the day-to-day operation of the district and is appointed by the school board; the board, elected at large in the district's service area, has responsibility for fiscal matters, hiring, firing, and other responsibilities. School board elections are non-partisan, and members serve four year terms.

A number of programs and departments fall under the superintendent's direction. They are:

 Advanced Program
 Auxiliary Services
 Business Department
 Clark County Special Education Co-Op 
 Curriculum and Instruction
 Educational Foundation
 Food Services
 General Counsel
 Health Services
 Human Resources
 Student Services
 Technology Services
 Transportation

Schools 

As of 2019, GCCS operates a total of twenty schools, including twelve elementary schools, four middle schools, three high schools, and two alternative schools. Two of the middle and high schools are combined into one building.

Elementary schools

Middle schools

High schools

Alternative schools

Under Construction 

As of April 2019, a new elementary school is under construction in downtown Jeffersonville; when completed, this school will replace Spring Hill and Maple Elementary Schools. The school will be open by the start of the 2020-2021 school year.

One school in the district's service area, Sacred Heart School in Jeffersonville, is operated by the Archdiocese of Indianapolis. Students in Clarksville attend either GCCS or Clarksville Community School Corporation, depending on the section of the town they live in. All high school juniors and seniors can attend the Prosser Career Education Center, located in nearby New Albany and operated by New Albany-Floyd County Schools.

Most of the district's auxiliary and administrative buildings are located in Jeffersonville.

Statistics 

As of the 2012-2013 school year, the overall graduation rate for GCCS was 90.2%, above the state average. 58.1% of students received free or reduced lunch, above the state average.

Athletics 

School athletics are largely overseen at the individual school level. Charlestown High School is a part of the Indiana High School Athletic Association Mid-Southern Conference, and is Class 3A except for the soccer teams, which are Class 2A; Jeffersonville High School is part of the Hoosier Hills Conference, and is in Class 4A except for football, which is Class 6A, and the soccer teams, which are Class 2A, and New Washington Middle/High School is part of the Southern Athletic Conference and is class A; football and soccer are not part of New Washington's athletic offerings.

Jeffersonville High School won the 1992-1993 boys' basketball, 2010-2011 girls' 4A basketball, and the 1974-1975 and 1976-1977 girls' track championships.

References

External links
 

Education in Clark County, Indiana
School districts in Indiana